Wushu has been contested at the World Games as an invitational sport in 2009 and 2013 with taolu and sanda events. In the 2022 World Games, wushu will return as an invitational sport but only with taolu events.

Editions

Medal table

References 

Wushu at the World Games
Wushu competitions
Wushu at multi-sport events
Sports at the World Games